The 1965 NAIA Soccer Championship was the seventh annual tournament held by the NAIA to determine the national champion of men's college soccer among its members in the United States.

Defending champions Trenton State defeated Earlham in the final, 6–2, to claim the Lions' second NAIA national title.

The final was played at Rockhurst College in Kansas City, Missouri.

Bracket

See also  
 1965 NCAA Soccer Championship

References 

NAIA championships
NAIA
NAIA
1965 in sports in Missouri